Croton subaemulans is a species of plant of the genus Croton and the family Euphorbiaceae.

See also 
 List of Croton species

subaemulans
Plants described in 1890